Life Support is the fourth studio album by British-Australian soft rock duo Air Supply, released in 1979. The album contains the original version of the later hit single "Lost in Love", which peaked at number 13 on Australian charts. "Just Another Woman" would also be re-released on the album Lost in Love. The album was reissued on CD in 1996 with a new cover.

Track listing
All tracks are written by Graham Russell.
 "Give Me Love" (4:07)
 "Looking Out for Something Outside" (4:05)
 "Lost in Love" (5:34)
 "I Just Like the Feeling" (4:18)
 "More Than Natural" (4:24)
 "Just Another Woman" (3:38)
 "Bring Out the Magic" (3:51)
 "I Don't Want to Lose You" (4:09)
 "Believe in the Supernatural" (6:14)

Personnel
Air Supply
 Russell Hitchcock – vocals
 Graham Russell – vocals, rhythm guitar
 Brian Hamilton – vocals, bass
 David Moyse – lead and rhythm guitars
 Ralph Cooper – drums, percussion
Additional Personnel
 Geoff Oakes – brass
 Mike Bukovsky – brass
 Peter Walker – guitar
 Tommy Emmanuel – guitar
 Frank Esler-Smith – synthesizer
 Cos Russo – keyboards

Charts

References

1979 albums
Air Supply albums
Sony Music albums